Indolophus is an extinct genus of perissodactyl belonging to the clade Tapiromorpha, which includes modern-day tapirs. Fossils have been found in the Early Eocene of Myanmar.

Description
Indolophus can be distinguished from other tapiromorphs in the characteristics of the upper dentition; it is distinguished from other basal tapiromorphs in having a more developed molar and protolophid and hypolophid. Indolophus is more primitive than tapiroids due to the lophodont dentiton and the absence of lingual and buccal cingula and molar metaconule.

References

Odd-toed ungulates
Fossil taxa described in 1925